Kristoffer Normann Hansen (born 12 August 1994) is a Norwegian professional footballer who plays as a winger for Ekstraklasa side Widzew Łódź.

He started his career in Larvik Turn, and joined the regional great team Sandefjord as a junior in 2010. He made his first team debut in 2011.

Career statistics

References

1994 births
Living people
People from Larvik
Norwegian footballers
Norway under-21 international footballers
Norway youth international footballers
Association football midfielders
Sandefjord Fotball players
Sarpsborg 08 FF players
Ullensaker/Kisa IL players
Widzew Łódź players
Norwegian First Division players
Eliteserien players
I liga players
Ekstraklasa players
Norwegian expatriate footballers
Expatriate footballers in Poland
Norwegian expatriate sportspeople in Poland
Sportspeople from Vestfold og Telemark